Birgith Reklev (born in Trondheim) is a Norwegian disabled athlete. She participated in the Paralympic Summer Games. She won three medals in swimming, including two of which are gold.

Career 
At the 1960 Summer Paralympic Games , she won a Gold medal in 25 meters backstroke, and a Gold medal in 25 meters breaststroke.

At the 1968 Paralympic Summer Games, she won a Bronze medal in 50 meters backstroke (class 4).

References 

Living people
Sportspeople from Trondheim
Paralympic swimmers of Norway
Norwegian female backstroke swimmers
Norwegian female breaststroke swimmers
Swimmers at the 1960 Summer Paralympics
Swimmers at the 1968 Summer Paralympics
Medalists at the 1960 Summer Paralympics
Medalists at the 1968 Summer Paralympics
Paralympic gold medalists for Norway
Paralympic bronze medalists for Norway
Year of birth missing (living people)